Baba Shah Ahmad (also Romanized as Bābā Shāh Aḩmad) is a village in Gurani Rural District, Gahvareh District, Dalahu County, Kermanshah Province, Iran. At the 2006 census, its population was 122, in 29 families.

Religious Significance
Baba Shah Ahmad (Bawe Şame) is one of holy places of Yarsan followers.

References 

Populated places in Dalahu County
Yarsan holy places